Accelerate: The Science of Lean Software and DevOps: Building and Scaling High Performing Technology Organizations is a software engineering book co-authored by Nicole Forsgren, Jez Humble and Gene Kim. The book explores how software development teams using Lean Software and DevOps can measure their performance and the performance of software engineering teams impacts the overall performance of an organization.

24 Key Capabilities 
The authors outline 24 practices to improve software delivery which they refer to as “key capabilities” and group them into five categories.

Continuous Delivery 
 Use Version Control for all Production Artifacts
 Automate Your Deployment Process
 Implement Continuous Integration
 Use Trunk-Based Development Methods
 Implement Test Automation
 Support Test Data Management
 Shift Left on Security
 Implement Continuous Delivery (CD)

Architecture 
 Use a Loosely Coupled Architecture
 Architect for Empowered Teams

Product and Process 
 Gather and Implement Customer Feedback
 Make the Flow of Work Visible through the Value Stream
 Work in Small Batches
 Foster and Enable Team Experimentation

Lean Management and Monitoring 
 Have a Lightweight Change Approval Processes
 Monitor across Application and Infrastructure to Inform Business Decisions
 Check System Health Proactively
 Improve Processes and Manage Work with Work-In-Process (WIP) Limits
 Visualize Work to Monitor Quality and Communicate throughout the Team

Cultural 
 Support a Generative Culture
 Encourage and Support Learning
 Support and Facilitate Collaboration among Teams
 Provide Resources and Tools that Make Work Meaningful
 Support or Embody Transformational Leadership

Four Key Metrics 

The authors examine 23,000 data points from a variety of companies of various different sizes (from start-up to enterprises), for-profit and not-for-profit and both those with legacy systems and those with modern systems.

DevOps research conducted by the authors and summarized in Accelerate demonstrates four key metrics that are indicators of software delivery performance, leading to higher rates of profitability, market share and customer satisfaction for their respective companies. The authors identified that “highest performers are twice as likely to meet or exceed their organizational performance goals.”

The four metrics identified are as follows:

 Change Lead Time - Time to implement, test, and deliver code for a feature (measured from first commit to deployment)
 Deployment Frequency - Number of deployments in a given duration of time
 Change Failure Rate - Percentage of failed changes over all changes (regardless of success)
 Mean Time to Recovery (MTTR) - Time it takes to restore service after production failure

The authors further measure how various technical practices (like outsourcing) and risk factors impact performance metrics for an engineering team. These metrics can be crudely measured using psychometrics or using commercial services.

References

External links 
 Accelerate: The Science of Lean Software and DevOps: Building and Scaling High Performing Technology Organizations (IT Revolution)
  QCon Plus (May 17-28): Stay Ahead of Emerging Software Trends Q&A on the Book Accelerate: Building and Scaling High Performance Technology Organizations

Computer programming books
Computer books